Gökçepınar is a village in the Çorum District of Çorum Province in Turkey. Its population is 45 (2022). The village is populated by Kurds.

References

Villages in Çorum District
Kurdish settlements in Çorum Province